The Insley Manufacturing Company produced heavy construction equipment, and was based in Indianapolis, Indiana.

History
The company was founded in 1907 by William Henry Insley (born 1870). The company holds many patents for cable-operated digging equipment such as Dragline excavators and power shovels, such as the Insley model k12. Insley lost its independence in 1975 when purchased by United Dominion Industries; the name is currently held by Badger Equipment Co.

See also
 M1918 light repair truck
 Dump truck (bottom dump)

External links
 Bio.
 http://www.google.ca/patents?scoring=2&num=100&q=+INSLEY+Manufacturing&btnG=Search+Patents patent list
 hoe
 http://www.fundinguniverse.com/company-histories/United-Dominion-Industries-Limited-Company-History.html
 https://web.archive.org/web/20091128070829/http://www.badgerequipment.com/about/history-badger-equipment.php

Defunct companies based in Indianapolis
Construction equipment manufacturers of the United States
Mining equipment companies
Mining in the United States